Canton City can refer to:

 Guangzhou, Guangdong, a city in China
 Canton City, North Dakota in USA
 Canton, Ohio in USA
 Canton, Georgia in USA